Rattray is a surname of Scottish origin. It was first used by the descendants of Analus de Rateriff and is derived from Rattray in Perth and Kinross. Notable people with the surname include:

Cathy Rattray-Williams (born 1963), Jamaican track and field sprinter
Celine Rattray (born 1975), film producer
Charlie Rattray (1911–1995), English footballer
Colin Rattray (1931–2009), Australian politician
David Rattray (1958–2007), South African historian
James Rattray (1818–1854), was a Lieutenant and War (Artist) in the British Army, serving in Afghanistan
James Rattray (c1790-1862) was an Admiral in the Royal Navy
Jamie Lee Rattray (born 1992), Canadian ice hockey player
Robert Sutherland Rattray (1881–1938), British anthropologist and africanist
Tania Rattray (born 1958), Australian politician, daughter of Colin Rattray
Thomas Rattray (1684–1743), Primus of the Scottish Episcopal Church

See also
Clan Rattray

References

Scottish toponymic surnames